Bhatana is a village development committee in Baitadi District in Sudurpashchim Province of western Nepal. At the time of the 1991 Nepal census it had a population of 3,202 and had 571 houses in the village.

References

Populated places in Baitadi District